Henry P. Sullivan (August 21, 1916 – April 24, 2003) was an American lawyer and politician.

Early life
Henry Phillip Sullivan was born on August 21, 1916 in Manchester, New Hampshire. His father was Phillip Sullivan and his mother, Johanna Sheehan.

Sullivan graduated from The Catholic University of America, where he received a bachelor of arts degree. He subsequently received a law degree from the Columbus School of Law, CUA's law school.

Career
Sullivan started his career at the Federal Bureau of Investigation (FBI) in law school. He subsequently served in the United States Army Air Forces. In 1946, he was admitted to the New Hampshire Bar, and began a legal practise in Manchester.

Sullivan served as a Democratic member of the New Hampshire House of Representatives and the New Hampshire Senate.

Personal life
Sullivan married Mary McCaffrey. They had a daughter, Kathy Sullivan, a former chairwoman of the New Hampshire Democratic Party.

Death
Sullivan died on April 24, 2003 in Manchester, New Hampshire.

References

1916 births
2003 deaths
Politicians from Manchester, New Hampshire
Catholic University of America alumni
Columbus School of Law alumni
New Hampshire lawyers
Democratic Party members of the New Hampshire House of Representatives
Democratic Party New Hampshire state senators
20th-century American politicians
20th-century American lawyers